The Bergenhus Regiment was a Norwegian Army infantry regiment located in the counties of Hordaland and Sogn og Fjordane. It was first formed in 1628 and finally disbanded in 2002. In 2006 it was decided that as the Norwegian Home Guard has taken over both the territorial responsibility and recruitment area of the old regiments they are recognised as their successors. Thus battle honours and history has been transferred to them and new banners based on the old regimental colours were created to reflect that. The history of Bergenhus Regiment is carried on by Bergenhus Heimevernsdistrikt 09 and Møre og Fjordane Heimevernsdistrikt 11.

Introduction
Bergenhus Regiment was first raised in 1628 as part of the Danish King Christian IV's plan to create a Norwegian army. Most armies of that time had in their ranks large proportions of  mercenaries, expensive troops to maintain and sometimes of questionable loyalty.
Thus by raising an army that was to manned by his own rural subjects he wished to create an organization that would be loyal, could quickly be put on a war-footing and that could serve his interest, both in war and peace.

To recruit men for this army all farms in the realm from Båhus in the south to Trøndelag in the central north was organized into the "legd"-system. A "legd" consisted of four full farms, which together would provide and equip a single soldier.

The initial strength of the army consisted of five regiments:

Trondhjemske Regiment
Bergenhusiske Regiment
Tunsberghusiske Regiment
Akershusiske Regiment
Bohus Regiment

There were also three independent companies:

Jämtlands Kompani
Stavanger lens Fahnlein
Agdesidens Fahnlein

Baptism of fire and the growth of an institution (1628-1700)
Despite the initial ambitious plans for the creation and further expansion of the Norwegian army, the costs proved too much at the time for any proper organization and fielding of the planned army. Because of this it remained mostly a paper organization until around 1640 when the threat of war loomed on the horizon. The lower ranks had until then been on the rolls, assigned and sometimes trained but the required number of officer were sorely lacking. With the new situation arising in 1640 the number of companies in the regiment was raised from four to six and a number of new officers were hired to fill the vacant positions in the regiment.

The Great Northern war (1700-1721)

The Oldenburg monarchy at peace (1721-1789)

The Napoleonic wars (1789-1814)

Union with Sweden (1814-1905)

Independence and World War 1 (1905-1918)

The interwar years (1918-1940)

World War 2 (1940-1945)

Postwar and Nato (1946-2002)

The end of an era (2002)

Various

(Periods when the original regiment was divided into several separate units as a result of army re-organizations are shown with the designations of all these units listed.)

See also
 Allied campaign in Norway
 Great Northern War
 Great Northern War and Norway
 Gunboat War
 List of Danish wars
 List of Swedish wars                                                
 Norway in 1814
 Norwegian Army
 Operation Weserübung
 Swedish campaign against Norway (1814)

Regiments of Norway
1628 establishments in Norway

grenadier regiment